Stará Lehota is a village and municipality in Nové Mesto nad Váhom District in the Trenčín Region of western Slovakia.

History
In historical records the village was first mentioned in 1348.

Geography
The municipality lies at an altitude of 326 metres and covers an area of 16.167 km². It has a population of about 263 people.

External links
 Official page
http://www.statistics.sk/mosmis/eng/run.html

Villages and municipalities in Nové Mesto nad Váhom District